Dead Letters is the fifth album by Finnish band The Rasmus released in 2003. It was released later in 2004 in the US, UK and Australia. Their previous album, Into, had seen some success in some parts of Europe, particularly Scandinavia and Germany, but Dead Letters signified the band's major break-through. The album received 8 Gold and 6 Platinum music certification awards. Lead single "In the Shadows" received 6 gold and 2 platinum awards, selling over 1 million copies and breaking the record for performance royalties received abroad on a Finnish composition (overtaking the works of Jean Sibelius).

Making of the album

The Rasmus recorded Dead Letters in June–December 2002 at Nord Studios in Sweden, reuniting with Mikael Nord Andersen and Martin Hansen, who had produced their Scandinavian hit album Into.

Lead singer Lauri Ylönen explained the title of the album on the band's website. "Each song is a letter to somebody. It could be an apology, confession or cry out for help". The back side of the album booklet reads:

Critical reception
Allmusic rated the album 3 stars out of 5. The review said "This Finnish group is more than capable of presenting dark and moody yet very finely tuned rock songs". It rated the best tracks as "Time to Burn", "Not Like the Other Girls" and the re-recording of "F-F-F-Falling", of which the original version appears on the Into album, and was added to the UK release as a bonus track.

Commercial performance
Dead Letters was released in Europe in early 2003. It reached the top of the album charts in Germany, Austria and Switzerland as well as in Finland, where it stayed in the Top 20 Album chart for over a year. The album was released in the UK in 2004, being the first record to be released in the country by the band, and was one of the Top 50 best-selling albums of 2004. Commercial success in Europe led to the release of the album in other parts of the world. Dead Letters and lead single "In the Shadows" both reached the Top 50 of the Australian ARIA charts in 2004, as well as the Top 20 of the American Billboard Heatseeker charts.

The Rasmus received numerous music awards across Europe, winning the 'Best Nordic Act' category in the 2003 MTV Europe Music Awards, and five Finnish EMMA awards for Best Group, Best Album, Best Video (In My Life), Best Artist and Export in 2004. The band also won an ECHO award for best international newcomer and were awarded "Best International Artist" at the 2004 MTV Russia Music Awards. "In The Shadows" was on the nominations list for the 2004 Kerrang! Award for Best Single.

Track listing

Personnel 
The Rasmus
 Lauri Ylönen – vocals
 Pauli Rantasalmi – guitar
 Eero Heinonen – bass
 Aki Hakala – drums

Additional musicians
 Rutger Gunnarson – strings
 Ylva Nilsson, Håkan Westlund, and Anna Wallgreen – cellos
 Jörgen Ingeström – additional keyboards

Production and design
 Mikael Nord and Martin Hansen – record producer, mixdown, programming, keyboards, and additional sounds
 George Marino – mastering
 Lars Tengroth – A&R
 Seppo Vesterinen – business management
 Dina Hovsepian – design
 Henrik Walse – logo
 Henrik Walse and Nela Koenig – photos

B-sides, outtakes and non-album tracks

Release history
A list of countries and the date when the album was released.

Music videos
 In the Shadows – Finnish "Bandit" version (2003)
Video directed by Finn Andersson for Film Magica Oy in Helsinki, Finland.

 In My Life (2003)
Video directed by Niklas Fronda and Fredrik Löfberg, Baranga Film/Topaz.

 In the Shadows – European "Crow" version (2003)
Video directed by Niklas Fronda & Fredrik Löfberg, Baranga Film in Stockholm, Sweden.

 First Day of My Life (2003)
Video directed by Sven Bollinger and produced by Volker Steinmetz (Erste Liebe Filmproduktion) in Lausitzring, Germany.

 In the Shadows – US/UK "Mirror" version (2004)
Video directed by Philipp Stöltzl in Bucharest, Romania.

 Funeral Song (The Resurrection) (2004)
Video directed by Niklas Fronda and Fredrik Löfberg, Baranga Film in Stockholm, Sweden.

Guilty (2004)
Video directed by Nathan Cox in Los Angeles.

See also
 Live Letters, a live DVD released in 2004.

Charts

Weekly charts

Year-end charts

Certifications and sales

References

External links
 Dead Letters on Playground Music
 Dead Letters review at Allmusic

The Rasmus albums
2003 albums